Paradise is the debut studio album by Australian singer Cody Simpson. It was released on 28 September 2012 by Atlantic Records. The album spawned two singles: "Got Me Good" and "Wish U Were Here" featuring Becky G.

Background
On 12 June 2012, Simpson released Preview to Paradise, a four-song teaser EP. The EP featured the songs "Got Me Good", "So Listen", "Wish U Were Here", and "Gentleman". All of the songs, besides "So Listen" were released as a part of Paradise. Simpson stated the reason behind only having a few collaborations on the album is because "I wanted my debut full length album to be a representation of me." It was released on 28 September 2012.

Singles
On 25 May 2012, the lead single, "Got Me Good" was released as a teaser on Simpson's official website and radio. The accompanying music video was released on 5 June.

"Wish U Were Here", which features American musician Becky G, was the second official single off the album, released on 12 June 2012. The music video debuted on 7 August 2012. Four days later, three remixes of the song were released.

Promotional singles
"So Listen" was released as a promotional single for Paradise. It features rapper T-Pain. It debuted on Simpson's YouTube channel on 12 March 2012 and was released to iTunes the following day. Simpson stated that the song was not an accurate example of the full album and he only put it on the preview "because my fans like it." The song is included on the Japanese special edition of Paradise.

Track listing

Charts

Release history

References

Cody Simpson albums
2012 debut albums
Albums produced by DJ Frank E
Albums produced by Dr. Luke
Albums produced by Supa Dups
Atlantic Records albums